Continence may refer to:

Fecal continence, the ability to control defecation, see Fecal incontinence
Urinary continence, the ability to control urination, see Urinary incontinence, the involuntary excretion of urine
Sexual continence, a synonym of  Coitus reservatus
Sexual abstinence

Incontinence (philosophy), a lack of self-control (Greek: ἀκρασία)